James Simon Kunen (born 1948) is an American author, journalist and lawyer. He is best known as the author of The Strawberry Statement, a first-person documentary of the Columbia University protests of 1968.

Biography
James Simon Kunen is an alumnus of Fay School and Phillips Academy. He attended Columbia University during the 1968 student protests and participated in the student sit-in at the institution's Hamilton Hall, resulting in his arrest for trespassing. This experience led him to write The Strawberry Statement, documenting the university's controversial involvement with the government's Institute for Defense Analyses.

After graduating from Columbia in 1970, he became a field journalist from Vietnam for True. This experience led to Standard Operating Procedure, his second published work.

Afterward, he graduated from the New York University School of Law and moved to Washington, D.C., where he became a public defender. His experiences in criminal courts led to his writing How Can You Defend Those People?, published by Random House in 1983.

After leaving the Public Defender Service in Washington, Kunen worked as an editorial page editor at Newsday on Long Island before joining People as a writer and editor. His coverage for People of the worst drunk driving crash in the U.S. spurred him to write Reckless Disregard: Corporate Greed, Government Indifference and the Kentucky School Bus Crash, his fourth book.

Kunen has also written articles for The New Yorker, Newsday, and New York Times Magazine, and other notable publications.

After losing employment with Time Warner as a director of communications, having worked with the company for two decades, he wrote a book called Diary of a Company Man: Losing a Job: Finding Life, published in January 2012.

Personal life

Kunen is married to Lisa Karlin, who is a radio journalist and social worker. They reside in Brooklyn, New York and have two children.

Works
The Strawberry Statement – Notes of a College Revolutionary (1968) 
Standard Operating Procedure: Notes of a Draft-Age American (1971)
"How Can You Defend Those People?": The Making of a Criminal Lawyer (1983) 
Reckless Disregard: Corporate Greed, Government Indifference, and the Kentucky School Bus Crash (1994) 
Diary of a Company Man: Losing a Job, Finding a Life (2012)

References

Sources
Harper's

External links
James Kunen.com/
Amazon page for James Kunen

March 19, 2012 Interview on WNYC Leonard Lopate show

1948 births
Living people
Public defenders
American male journalists
20th-century American writers
21st-century American non-fiction writers
Phillips Academy alumni
Columbia College (New York) alumni
New York University School of Law alumni
20th-century American lawyers
Fay School alumni
21st-century American male writers